Gérard Defaux (9 May 1937 – 31 December 2004) was a French American writer.

Defaux later took the pseudonym Panurge, after a character in Rabelais' Gargantua and Pantagruel. Defaux began teaching at Trent University in 1967, leaving for Bryn Mawr College in 1969. Defaux joined the Yale University faculty in 1979. His association with Johns Hopkins University started in 1981. That same year, Defaux received a Guggenheim Fellowship. The French government awarded Defaux an Ordre des Palmes Académiques, followed by knighthood of the Ordre des Arts et des Lettres in 1997. Defaux was diagnosed with a brain tumor in February 2004, and died 31 December 2004, in a Paris hospital at the age of 67.

References

1937 births
2004 deaths
French expatriates in Canada
Yale University faculty
Academic staff of Trent University
Johns Hopkins University faculty
Bryn Mawr College faculty
University of Paris alumni
Chevaliers of the Ordre des Arts et des Lettres
Deaths from brain cancer in France
Recipients of the Ordre des Palmes Académiques
Writers from Paris
French emigrants to the United States
People with acquired American citizenship